First Baptist Church is a historic Baptist church located at 200 Old Street in Fayetteville, Cumberland County, North Carolina. It was built between 1906 and 1910, and is a Romanesque Revival style brick church.  It has a gable front flanked by towers of unequal size.

It was listed on the National Register of Historic Places in 1983.

References

Baptist churches in North Carolina
Churches in Fayetteville, North Carolina
Churches on the National Register of Historic Places in North Carolina
Romanesque Revival church buildings in North Carolina
Churches completed in 1906
20th-century Baptist churches in the United States
National Register of Historic Places in Cumberland County, North Carolina
1906 establishments in North Carolina